Antoine Philippe Léon Blondel (16 November 1795 – 27 April 1886) was a French politician who was briefly Minister of Finance in the last cabinet of the French Second Republic.

Life

Antoine Léon Philippe Blondel was born in Paris on 16 November 1795. 
He followed an administrative career.
During the July Monarchy he was made a knight of the Legion of Honour on 1 January 1834, officer on 12 March 1837 and commander on 14 April 1844.  
In 1844 he was a counselor of state and director general of the forest administration.

Blondel was appointed Minister of Finance on 26 October 1851.
On 23 November 1851 François-Xavier Joseph de Casabianca was transferred from the ministry of Agriculture to that of Finance.
In the Second French Empire Blondel was a counselor of state from 1854 until 8 October 1866.
On 5 March 1866 he entered the imperial senate, where he sat until 4 September 1870 among the most devoted supporters of the regime.
He died in Paris on 27 April 1886 at the age of 90.

References
Citations

Sources

1795 births
1886 deaths
French politicians